Extinction Level Event 2: The Wrath of God is the tenth studio album by American rapper Busta Rhymes. The album features guest appearances from Kendrick Lamar, Mariah Carey, Anderson .Paak, Q-Tip, Rick Ross, Mary J. Blige, Rapsody, Ol' Dirty Bastard, Rakim, Pete Rock, Vybz Kartel, Bell Biv DeVoe, M.O.P., Nikki Grier, Chris Rock, and Louis Farrakhan. It is a sequel to 1998's E.L.E. (Extinction Level Event): The Final World Front, and his first studio album since 2012's Year Of The Dragon.

The album was met with generally favorable reviews. The album debuted at number seven on the US Billboard 200 chart, earning 38,000 album-equivalent units in its first week.

Background 
Busta Rhymes first announced the album in 2013. Over the course of 2014, Busta Rhymes continued to do interviews promoting the album, and released the singles "Twerk It" featuring Nicki Minaj, "Thank You" featuring Q-Tip, Lil Wayne and Kanye West, and "Calm Down" featuring Eminem. Despite the heavy promotion around this time, promotion for the album ceased completely in July 2014, when it was announced that Rhymes had amicably departed Cash Money Records.

The album was announced once again on August 17, 2020, via a YouTube video starring Chris Rock. It released officially on October 30, 2020. The "Reloaded" version of the album released on November 2, 2020, featuring three brand new tracks and the previously-released 2014 single "Calm Down" with Eminem. An official deluxe edition was also released later that month on November 27, 2020, not only featuring the bonus tracks from the Reloaded reissue, but also four more extra tracks, including a remix of "Czar" with new verses by M.O.P. and rapper CJ.

Singles 
The album's lead single "The Don and the Boss", featuring Vybz Kartel and J-Doe, was released on August 21, 2020. The album's second single "YUUUU" featuring Anderson .Paak was released on September 18, 2020. "Where I Belong" featuring Mariah Carey was released as the album's third single on April 7, 2021, and is set to be released to American rhythmic contemporary radio stations on April 13.

Critical reception

Extinction Level Event 2: The Wrath of God was met with generally favorable reviews. At Metacritic, which assigns a normalized rating out of 100 to reviews from mainstream publications, the album received an average score of 71, based on six reviews.

Commercial performance
Extinction Level Event 2: The Wrath of God debuted at number seven on the US Billboard 200 chart, earning 38,000 album-equivalent units (including 17,000 copies as pure album sales) in its first week. This became Busta Rhymes' seventh US top-ten album. The album also accumulated a total of 27.78 million on-demand streams of the album's songs that week.

Track listing

Charts

References 

2020 albums
Busta Rhymes albums
Sequel albums
Albums produced by DJ Premier
Albums produced by Pete Rock
Albums produced by Nottz
Albums produced by 9th Wonder
Albums produced by Jahlil Beats
Albums produced by J Dilla
Albums produced by Rockwilder
Albums produced by Focus...
Albums produced by Hi-Tek
Albums produced by Terrace Martin
Albums produced by Murda Beatz
Albums produced by DJ Scratch
Albums produced by Swizz Beatz
Albums produced by Rick Rock
Conglomerate (record label) albums
Empire Distribution albums